Knox Presbyterian Church can refer to:

In Canada:
Knox Presbyterian Church, (Georgetown)
Knox Presbyterian Church (Hamilton)
Knox Presbyterian Church (Oakville)
Knox Presbyterian Church (Ottawa)
Knox Presbyterian Church (Swift Current) from 1913 to 1943
Knox Presbyterian Church (Toronto)
Knox United Church (Scarborough)

In the United States:
Knox Presbyterian Church (Harrison Township, Michigan)
Knox Presbyterian Church, Hyde Park, Cincinnati, Ohio